Jacqueline Felice de Almania (· ), was reportedly from Florence, Italy. She was an early 14th-century French physician in Paris, France who was placed on trial in 1322 for unlawful practice.

Career 
Referring to herself as nobilis mulier domino Jacoba, indicating that she was of a high social class, Jacqueline Felice de Almania was known as a health specialist, treating both men and women for medical conditions. She had a reputation for having successful outcomes of her treatments.  It was reported that individuals were directed to her if their previous treatment for fever, paralyses, or other medical conditions had failed. Individuals also went to her for medical attention when licensed physicians did not treat their conditions. She believed in the concept of "women's secrets"- the idea that a woman should look at other women's private parts, breasts, belly etc., as a barrier to keep men from knowing about "women's business".

Jacqueline Felice did not receive training at a University, and this caused physicians to feel offended because she used techniques as licensed physicians did, such as visiting the ill, examining urine by its physical appearance, touching the body, and prescribing potions, digestions, and laxatives.  Her medical practice had a policy of not charging a fee unless there was a cure following the treatment.

Trial 
In 1322, however, Jacobina Félicie was put on trial for unlawful practice. She was placed on trial against the Medical Faculty of Paris solely for the reason that she practiced medicine without a medical license. In her defense, Jacobina believed that it was improper for men to palpate the breasts and abdomens of women. During the trial, there were eight witnesses, all being her patients besides one, that testified to her medical skills. According to one witness, she was reputed to be a better physician and surgeon than any of the French physicians in Paris. By being a better physician and surgeon as well as not charging patients if her treatments were unsuccessful, she seemed to anger male physicians.

At the end of the trial, Jacqueline Felice de Almania was found guilty and was threatened with excommunication if she was ever caught practicing medicine again. She was also banned from practicing medicine, although it is unknown if she continued to be a medical healer after the trial, and she was handed a fine of 60 Parisian pounds. The prosecution's case was based upon the absence of formal training at a university, but no effort was made to test her knowledge of medicine.  Despite the testimonies that she was able to cure people the male physicians had given up on, the court reasoned that it was obvious that a man could understand the subject of medicine better than a woman because of his gender. This decision is considered to have banned women from academic study in medicine in France and obtaining licenses until the 19th-century.

Notes 

 Jacobina Félicie's story is the fullest account that is documented to have actual hands-on practices of a historical female medical practitioner.

References 

 Practical medicine from Salerno to the black death AvLuis García Ballester
 Teaching history AvHilary Bourdillon

Citations

Year of birth missing
Year of death missing
14th-century people of the Republic of Florence
Medieval women physicians
14th-century Italian physicians